Grylloblatta sculleni is a species of insect in the family Grylloblattidae that is found in Oregon, United States. Its type locality is Scott Camp in Deschutes County, Oregon, United States.

References

Grylloblattidae
Insects of the United States
Insects described in 1937